Leatherstocking Creek is a small creek in central Otsego County, New York. It begins northwest of Pierstown and flows southeast then south before flowing into Otsego Lake north of Cooperstown, and just south of Three Mile Point.

The historic Leatherstocking Falls also known as "Panthers Leap" and "Deowongo Falls", are located on this creek. These falls are where, in James Fenimore Cooper's Leatherstocking Tales, Leatherstocking saves the life of an Indian maiden.

References

Rivers of New York (state)
Rivers of Otsego County, New York